David Char Navas is a Colombian politician who served as Member of the Chamber of Representatives of Colombia from 2002 to 2006 and as Senator of Colombia from 2006 to 2008. He was forced to resign to his seat in the Senate due to controversies surrounding two incidents for which he was being investigated, the first related to a city contract that his company Los Ángeles Ltd signed with the then Mayor of Barranquilla Bernardo Hoyos Montoya; the second came to surface after his name appeared in a seized computer of Jorge 40, a paramilitary leader of the United Self-Defense Forces of Colombia.

Family
David comes from a well established and influential, Syrian-Arab-Colombian family, he is the son of Habib Char Abdala and Vivian Navas. He is the nephew of Fuad Char Abdala, and cousin of Arturo and Alejandro Char Chaljub, all politicians from the Atlántico Department. His family are the majority shareholders of the Junior Barranquilla, the city's foremost soccer team, and founders of Olimpica S.A., a chain of supermarkets in Colombia.

References

People from Barranquilla
David
Colombian people of Syrian descent
Living people
Radical Change politicians
Members of the Chamber of Representatives of Colombia
Members of the Senate of Colombia
Year of birth missing (living people)